Tenagodus anguinus is a species of unusual sea snail, a marine gastropod mollusk in the family Siliquariidae, the slit worm shells.

Description
The shell is thick and irregularly coiled in a gradually tapered spiral, with rather distant whorls. It has longitudinal ridges with spines on them throughout its length. It is generally a dirty-looking white colour, pale yellow or buff.

Distribution
Tenagodus anguinus is found in the Indian Ocean including around Madagascar.

References

 Born I. von (1780). Testacea Musei Caesarei Vindobonensis (...). Kraus, Vienna pp. XXXVI + 442 + 18 pl: page(s): 440
 Dillwyn, L. W. 1817. A descriptive catalogue of Recent shells, arranged according to the Linnean method; with particular attention to the synonymy. London: John and Arthur Arch. Vol. 2:581-1092 + index [29 pp.]. page(s): 1079, 1080
 Tryon, G. W. 1886. Naticidae, Calyptraeidae, Pyramidellidae. Manual of Conchology 8. Philadelphia. page(s): 256
 Hartman, Olga 1959. Catalogue of the Polychaetous Annelids of the World. Parts 1 and 2. Occasional Papers of the Allan Hancock Foundation, 23: 628pp
 Higo, S., Callomon, P. & Goto, Y. (1999) Catalogue and Bibliography of the Marine Shell-Bearing Mollusca of Japan. Elle Scientific Publications, Yao, Japan, 749 pp
 Bieler R. 2004. Sanitation with sponge and plunger: western Atlantic slit-wormsnails (Mollusca: Caenogastropoda: Siliquariidae). Zoological Journal of the Linnean Society, 140(3): 307-333. 
 Fauchald, Kristian (2007). World Register of Polychaeta

External links
  Bieler, R., 1992. Tenagodus or Siliquaria? Unravelling taxonomic confusion in marine "worm-snails" (Cerithioidea: Siliquariidae). The Nautilus, 106(1): 15-20 (27 February) 

Siliquariidae
Gastropods described in 1758
Taxa named by Carl Linnaeus